Parapleuropholis is an extinct genus of ray-finned fish that lived in what is now the Democratic Republic of the Congo during the early Toarcian stage of the Early Jurassic epoch.

References

Prehistoric teleostei
Prehistoric ray-finned fish genera
Toarcian genera
Early Jurassic fish
Paleontology in the Democratic Republic of the Congo
Fossil taxa described in 1955